Praful Pansheriya  (born 29 Dec 1971) is an Indian politician. He is a Minister of State (Parliamentary Affairs, Primary, Secondary and Adult Education, Higher Education) and Member of the Gujarat Legislative Assembly from the Kamrej Assembly constituency since 2022. He serves as Minister of State in the Ministry of Higher Education of Gujarat in the Second Bhupendrabhai Patel Ministry since December 12, 2022. He is associated with the Bharatiya Janata Party.

Awards
'Best Youth Social Worker' (Year-2004) by Nehru Vikas Kendra-Delhi 
'National Award for Excellence in Social Service' by International Organization UNO 
'Limca Book of World Record' for successful organization of seven (7) day Akhand Blood Donation Camp

References 

1971 births
Living people
Members of the Gujarat Legislative Assembly